Burckhardt Helferich (10 June 1887, in Greifswald – 5 July 1982, in Bonn) was a German chemist.

Biography
He was the son of surgery professor Heinrich Helferich (1851–1945). He studied science, especially Geology, at the University of Lausanne in Switzerland and from 1907 chemistry in Munich and Berlin. In Berlin, Helferich was advised by Emil Fischer and later became his assistant.

He became a professor of organic chemistry in Frankfurt before succeeding Rudolf Pummerer at the University of Greifswald. In 1930 he was called by the University of Leipzig to succeed Arthur Hantzsch as  director of the Chemistry Institute from 1930 to 1945. Helferich escaped Leipzig, and the American occupying forces evacuated him to Weilburg in 1945. In 1947 he became a professor at the University of Bonn, serving as rector in 1954/55. 

In 1951 he was awarded the Emil-Fischer-Medaille. In 1957 he won an Order of Merit of the Federal Republic of Germany (Commander's Cross). Helferich was voted into the German Academy of Sciences and was made an honorary doctor of the University of Stuttgart. Between 1911 and his retirement in 1974 he authored over 300 academic papers.

Since 2005, The University of Leipzig awards a Burckhardt-Helferich-Prize.

Bibliography
Hermann Stetter: Burckhardt Helferich. 1887–1982. In: Chemische Berichte. Vol. 118, Nr. 1, 1985, p. I-XIX

External links
 Biografie auf uni-leipzig.de
 University of Leipzig Professor Catalog

1887 births
1982 deaths
20th-century German chemists
Recipients of the Cross of the Order of Merit of the Federal Republic of Germany
Academic staff of Goethe University Frankfurt
Academic staff of the University of Greifswald
Academic staff of the University of Bonn
Academic staff of Leipzig University
German people of World War I
Presidents of the German Chemical Society